Brandon Harrison (born April 29, 1985) is a former American football safety. He was drafted by the Houston Texans in the fifth round of the 2007 NFL Draft. He played college football at Stanford.

He also played for the California Redwoods.

Professional career

California Redwoods
Harrison was signed by the California Redwoods of the United Football League on October 19, 2009.

References

External links
 Houston Texans bio
 Stanford Cardinal bio

1985 births
Living people
Players of American football from Baton Rouge, Louisiana
American football safeties
Stanford Cardinal football players
Houston Texans players
Sacramento Mountain Lions players
Catholic High School (Baton Rouge, Louisiana) alumni